Abolhassan Ali ebn-e Sahl Azhar Esfahani was a Persian mystic. He lived in the era of Abbasid Caliph Al-Mu'tadid and died in 894 in Isfahan. According to Spencer, he founded the first khanqah. His khanqah still exists and is also his mausoleum.

References 

9th-century Iranian people
894 deaths
9th-century people from the Abbasid Caliphate
Iranian Muslim mystics